Dunaújváros Pálhalma Agrospeciál Sport Egyesület  is a Hungarian football club located in Dunaújváros, Hungary. It currently plays in the Hungarian National Championship. The team's colors are blue and yellow. The team name derives from sponsorship from local agricultural firm Pálhalmai Agrospeciál Kft.

External links 
  
 Soccerway

Football clubs in Hungary
Association football clubs established in 1998
1998 establishments in Hungary
Dunaújváros